Atractus steyermarki is a species of snake in the family Colubridae. The species can be found in Venezuela through Guyana .

References 

Atractus
Reptiles of Venezuela
Reptiles described in 1958
Taxa named by Janis Roze